Michael Rose Jr. (born May 25, 2000) is an American football linebacker for the St. Louis BattleHawks of the XFL. He played college football at Iowa State.

Early life and high school
Rose grew up in Brecksville, Ohio and attended Brecksville–Broadview Heights High School, where he played basketball and football. He recorded 82 tackles, 10 tackles for a loss, and two interceptions and was named second-team All-Suburban League during his junior season. Rose had 53 tackles and 10 tackles for loss in seven games and was named first-team all-conference as a senior. He committed to Iowa State after receiving a late scholarship; Rose had previously been committed to play at Ball State.

College career
Rose became a starter at linebacker for Iowa State as a true freshman and was named honorable mention All-Big 12 Conference and a Freshman All-American by the FWAA after finishing the season with 75 tackles, nine tackles for loss, 1.5 sacks and a fumble recovery. He had 77 tackles, 9.5 tackles for loss, and 3.5 sacks with three passes broken up and an interception and was again named honorable mention All-Big 12 in his sophomore season. Rose was named first-team All-Big 12 and the conference Defensive Player of the Year as a junior.

Professional career

Kansas City Chiefs 
Rose signed with the Kansas City Chiefs as an undrafted free agent on May 7, 2022. He was waived on August 27, 2022.

St. Louis BattleHawks 
On November 17, 2022, Rose was drafted by the St. Louis BattleHawks of the XFL.

References

External links
Iowa State Cyclones bio

2000 births
Living people
American football linebackers
Iowa State Cyclones football players
Kansas City Chiefs players
People from Brecksville, Ohio
Players of American football from Ohio
St. Louis BattleHawks players
Sportspeople from Cuyahoga County, Ohio